

Events 
 Publication of the first English-language manual on the guitar.
 William Boyce becomes organist of the Chapel Royal.
Giovanni Battista Locatelli takes his opera productions to Russia.  Among the members of the troupe are the brothers Giuseppe and Vincenzo Manfredini.

Popular music 
 None listed

Opera 
Baldassare Galuppi – Il Mondo alla Roversa
Florian Leopold Gassmann – Issipile
Christoph Willibald Gluck – L'île de Merlin
Jean-Joseph Cassanéa de Mondonville – Les fêtes de Paphos, Op.10
Davide Perez – Solimano
Jean-Philippe Rameau – La Lyre enchantée
Tommaso Traetta – Buovo d'Antona

Classical music 
 Charles Avison – Twelve Concertos, Op. 6 (London and Newcastle)
 Carl Philipp Emanuel Bach 
 Fugue in D minor, H.99
 Sechs Sonaten für Clavier mit veränderten Reprisen, Wq.50 (H. 126, 136–140) (begun, completed 1759, published 1760)
 Keyboard Sonata in A major, H.133
 12 Kleine Stücke, H. 600, Wq. 81
 Geistliche Oden und Lieder I (Leipzig), H.686 (composed 1757)
 Franz Ignaz Beck – 6 Symphonies, Op. 1
 William Boyce – Overture No.7
 Giacomo Cervetto – 6 Trio Sonatas
 Baldassare Galuppi – L'oracolo del Vaticano
 Francesco Geminiani – The Harmonical Miscellany (periodical, in two volumes, London)
 Michael Haydn 
 Symphony No. 1 in C major
 Divertimento in C major, MH 27
 Pieter Hellendaal – 6 Concerti Grossi, Op. 3
 Johann Philipp Kirnberger – 8 Fugues (written for Prussian Princess Anna Amalia)
 Johann Adolph Scheibe – 3 Flute Sonatas, Op. 1
 Georg Philipp Telemann – Laudate Jehovam, TWV 7:25

Methods and theory writings 

 Jakob Adlung – Anleitung zu der musikalischen Gelahrtheit
 François Clément – Essai sur l'accompagnement du clavecin
 Friedrich Wilhelm Marpurg – Anleitung zur Singcomposition

Births 
February 1 – Ludwig Gotthard Kosegarten, librettist and poet (died 1818)
February 4 – Pierre-Gabriel Gardel, choreographer and ballet dancer (died 1840)
February 7 – Benedikt Schack, operatic tenor and composer (d. 1826)
February 12 – Christian Ignatius Latrobe, music collector and composer (died 1836)
April 23 – Matthieu Frédéric Blasius, composer and violinist (died 1829)
May 25 – Matthew Camidge, composer and organist (died 1844)
June 4 – Joseph Dacre Carlyle, librettist and orientalist (died 1804)
June 30 – António Leal Moreira, composer (died 1819)
July – Nicolas-Julien Forgeot, French librettist (died 1798)
August 25 – Franz Teyber, composer
September 25 
Maria Anna Thekla Mozart, cousin and correspondent of Wolfgang Amadeus Mozart (d. 1841)
Josepha Barbara Auernhammer, pianist and composer
October 5 
Thomas Greatorex, music collector and organist (died 1831)
August Heinrich Julius Lafontaine, librettist and novelist (died 1831) 
October 7 – Paul Anton Wineberger, composer
November 16 – Peter Andreas Heiberg, librettist and author (died 1841)
December 3 
Louis Adam, French composer (died 1848) 
Joseph Gelinek, composer and pianist (died 1825)
December 11 – Carl Friedrich Zelter, composer and editor (died 1832)
December 31 – Sophie Hagman, ballerina (d. 1826)
Date unknown 
Harriett Abrams, composer and musician (died 1821)
Glafira Alymova, harpsichordist (d. 1826) 
Josep Gallés, composer and organist (died 1836)
Bernardo Porta, Italian composer (died 1829)
John Sale, composer and bass singer (died 1827)

Deaths 
January 28 – Johann Paul Schiffelholz, composer for the mandora (born 1685)
March 22 – Richard Leveridge, opera singer (born 1670) 
April 2 – Johann Balthasar König, German composer (born 1691)

April 24 – Florian Wrastill, composer
April 30 – François d'Agincourt, organist, harpsichordist and composer (born 1684)
June – John Travers, organist and composer (born 1703)
July 15 – Ambrosius Stub, librettist and poet (born 1705)
October 4 – Giuseppe Antonio Brescianello, Italian composer and violinist (born c. 1690) 
October 14 – Wilhelmine Von Bayreuth, composer and princess (born 1709)
November 20 – Johan Helmich Roman, composer (born 1694)
November 27 – Senesino, castrato singer (born 1686)
December 5 – Johann Friedrich Fasch, composer (born 1688)
December 26 – François-Joseph de La Grange-Chancel, librettist and dramatist (born 1677) 
probable 
Sanctus Seraphin, violin-maker (born 1699)
Giuseppe Ferdinando Brivio, Italian composer (born 1699)  

 
18th century in music
Music by year